Do Go On is a spoof radio show which first aired in 1997 on BBC Radio 4.  The show won the comedy 2nd prize at the Sony Radio Awards. 

The show featured Griff Rhys Jones as Ainsley Elliott, Graeme Garden, Geoffrey McGivern and Melanie Hudson and was produced by TalkBack Productions.

External links
Titles and Air Dates Guide

BBC Radio comedy programmes
BBC Radio 4 programmes
1997 radio programme debuts